Latin is a language with three primary tenses: there is the future  ('I will do'), the present  ('I am doing'),  and the past  ('I did'). Read more about possible tenses in the article on grammatical tense.

This article covers only free indications of occurrences, that is, only free indicative clauses for what took place, is taking place, or will take place. For bound indications of occurrences, visit Latin tenses in relative clauses and Latin tenses in dependent clauses. For indications of frequency, possibility, volition and obligation, visit the article on Latin tenses with modality. For commands, see Latin tenses in commands.

Terminology

Stem aspect names

Inside the angle brackets, we find one example stem form for each stem aspect of the verb entry: <īnfectum, perfectum, supīnum>. However, all these forms share a common aspect, which starkly differs from the perfectum and supīnum aspects of other stems in the same verb entry and they vary systematically according to the selected ending (see Latin conjugation for details). For easy dictionary consultation, the tables below have a stem aspect column, indicating which stem aspect is selected for the main verb in the example.

Meaning names

In different books, there are alternative terms for past in future and past in past meanings. Tranditional grammar books refer to the primary meaning of the 'future perfect' and 'pluperfect' without ascribing a proper name to these meanings. Generative grammar books reserve the term "past" for tense inflection and  "perfect" for tense periphrasis and do not attribute a proper name to meanings either. In functional grammar books, grammarians often reserve the term "past" for the primary past and "perfect" for the secondary past, no matter if they are realised by a tense inflection or by a tense periphrasis. Finally, in systemic functional grammar books, grammarians often reserve the term "past" for an option in a tripartite system (past, present, future) and "perfect" for an option in a bipartite one (perfect vs imperfect [present or future]), depending on which options are available for a verb group in each language. The last ones differentiate between primary tense and secondary tense, both of which can have either past or perfect options, and they also differentiate tense inflection and tense periphrasis, providing different terms for all three linguistic phenomena. Therefore, the meaning names adopted in this section are the ones from systemic functional descriptions of grammar.

Primary tenses

Events and states can be represented in one of three primary tenses in Latin: future, present and past. Each primary tense is described in turn below.

Future

Most future processes are represented by a 'future indicative' verb, occasionally by a 'present indicative' verb in conditional clauses. Mental processes of remembering, hating and knowing are special. Future mental processes of this kind are represented by 'future perfect indicative' verbs as illustrated in the table below:

Present

Most present processes are represented by a 'present indicative' verb. In particular, static processes that have been ongoing for a long time are represented by a 'present indicative' verb: 1. often modified to a temporal adjunct such as  'for a while'; 2. expanded by a temporal dependent clause with the conjunction  'ever since'.; 3. as a temporal dependent clause itself with the conjunction  'since'; and 4. the temporal extensions such as  'it's for many years that'. Finally, mental processes of remembering, hating and knowing are represented by 'perfect indicative' verbs as illustrated in the table below.

The 'present indicative' in perefct passive/deponent periphrasis does not always represent a past event. It may also represent a present state. Similarly, The 'present indicative' in  perefct periphrasis may either represent a present ownership of placed objects or a present possession of placed parts. In case a motion takes place, according to Gildersleeve and Lodge, the  perfect periphrasis ('have') 'is not a mere circumlocution for the Perfect, but lays particular stress on the maintenance of the result' at present. In contrast, the 'present indicative' in  perfect periphrasis ('hold' or 'keep') represents the process of actively keeping a state in the present.

Past

In biographies, past events are usually represented by 'perfect indicative' verbs. However, in narrative prose and poetry, past events are most often represented by 'present indicative' verbs as if these events were taking place in front of the narrator. However, in recounts of battles long past at the time of narration, the 'imperfect indicative' is used to describe an event as though being watched by a traumatised observer, already deceased. Latin speaker Aulus Gellius says that the use of the 'imperfect indicative'  rather than the 'perfect indicative'  creates a 'drawn-out vivid description'.

For past events, the 'present indicative' paradigm is interchangeable with not only the 'perfect indicative', but also the 'imperfect indicative'. In Caesar's books, when a verb for a past event is placed initially in the sentence, as in the example below, it is very frequently 'present indicative'. Moreover, 'present indicative' verbs of saying often represent a past event when the one saying something is not the speaker/writer: e.g.  'they gave a pledge' or  'they begged'. More than half the 'present indicative' verbs for past events in Caesar's books are of this kind.

In some cases, the paradigm 'present indicative of periphrasitic  perfect' is often interchangeable with the 'perfect indicative' paradigm since both can realise a past tense. In later Latin the compound past with  became more common.

The perfect passive/deponent periphrasis with a 'present indicative' auxiliary most often represents a past event.

Secondary tenses

Events and states can also be represented in one of three secondary tenses in Latin: secondary future, secondary present, secondary past. Each secondary tense is described in turn below.

Secondary future

The secondary future is the tense of an event that is future at the time of another event, which in turn can be past, present, or future at the time of interaction. Most often, the secondary future is
realized by the future periphrasis.

In detail, the ‘present indicative’ paradigm of the periphrastic future realizes a “future in present” tense: that is, an event that is future while another event such as a dinner or a meeting is taking place. If applied to actions (e.g. , ‘am about to do’), it represents the person’s
present plan of action for after the interaction. In contrast, the future periphrasis with an ‘imperfect indicative’ auxiliary (e.g. , ‘was about to do’) represents a person’s past plan of action.

Secondary present

Secondary present verbs are often accompanied by spatial and temporal adjuncts
such as  'there',  'then', and  'at that moment'.
Present events in the future can realised by 'future indicative' verbs,
present events in the present by 'present indicative' verbs, and
present events in the past by 'imperfect indicative' verbs.

Alternatively, the 'coepī' present periphrasis can realise secondary past. For this periphrasis, like for verbs for mental processes, 'future perfect indicative' auxiliaries realise primary future, 'perfect indicative' for primary present, and 'pluperfect indicative' for primary past.

Secondary past

The 'pluperfect' paradigm can be used as in English to describe an event that had happened earlier than the time of the narrative.

Just as the Latin perfect tense can have two meanings "did" and "have done", so the Latin pluperfect tense can have the same two meanings transferred to a past context. So it can represent a simple action (e.g "they had sent it the previous year") or a state which prevailed at the time mentioned ("they had departed" = "they were absent").

When translating between English and Latin, translators must be aware that English has two wordings for a past event depending on whether the event has an effect in the present: for instance, an English speaker can say "they sent it last year" ('past simple' in English) or "they have departed" ('perfect' in English). This contrast in primary tense does not correspond to any contrast in secondary tense in English: "they had sent it the year before" ('past perfect' in English) and "they had departed" ('past perfect' in English). Secondary past in Latin is like its counterpart in English in this regard. The 'pluperfect' paradigm does not construe any of these two specific meanings.

Alternatively, the 'future indicative' of the  perfect periphrasis can also represent a 'past in future' event.

A 'pluperfect indicative' auxiliary in a 'passive periphrasis' can represent a 'past in past' state that had changed by the time of a past event. In turn, the past event is often represented by a 'perfect indicative' verb.

A 'past in past' meaning can similarly be realised with the 'perfect and imperfect indicative' of the  aspect periphrasis

Tertiary tenses

Tertiary past

Bibliography
Aerts, Simon (2018). "Tense, Aspect and Aktionsart in Classical Latin: Towards a New Approach". Symbolae Osloenses 92(1):107–149.
Andrewes, M. (1937). "Caesar's Use of Tense Sequence in Indirect Speech". The Classical Review, Vol. 51, No. 4 (Sep., 1937), pp. 114–116.
Andrewes, M. (1951). "The Function of Tense Variation in the Subjunctive Mood of Oratio Obliqua". The Classical Review, New Series, Vol. 1, No. 3/4 (Dec., 1951), pp. 142–146.
De Melo, Wolfgang (2007). "Latin prohibitions and the Origins of the u/w-Perfect and the Type amāstī". Glotta, Bd. 83 (2007), pp. 43–68.
De Melo, Wolfgang (2012). "Kuryłowicz's first 'law of analogy' and the development of passive periphrases in Latin". In Philomen Probert & Andreas Willi, Laws and Rules in Indo-European. Oxford, chapter 6, pp. 83–101.
Gildersleeve, B. L. & Gonzalez Lodge (1895). Gildersleeve's Latin Grammar. 3rd Edition. (Macmillan)
Goodrich, W. J. "On the Prospective Use of the Latin Imperfect Subjunctive in Relative Clauses". The Classical Review, Vol. 31, No. 3/4 (May - Jun., 1917), pp. 83–86.
Greenough, J. B. et al. (1903). Allen and Greenough's New Latin Grammar for Schools and Colleges. Boston and London.
Haverling, Gerd V.M. (2002). "On the semantic functions of the Latin perfect". Amsterdam Studies in Classical Philology, Volume 10.
Haverling, Gerd V.M. (2012). "Actionality, tense, and viewpoint". In Baldi, Philip; Cuzzolin, Pierluigi (eds.) (2012). Constituent Syntax: Adverbial Phrases, Adverbs, Mood, Tense. , pp. 277–524.
Kennedy, Benjamin Hall (1871). The Revised Latin Primer. Edited and further revised by Sir James Mountford, Longman 1930; reprinted 1962.
Ker, James (2007). "Roman Repraesentatio". The American Journal of Philology, Vol. 128, No. 3 (Autumn, 2007), pp. 341–365.
Madvig, J. N. (1842). . In , vol. 2. pp. 218–226.
Pinkster, Harm (1987). "The Strategy and Chronology of the Development of Future and Perfect Tense Auxiliaries in Latin". In Martin Harris and Paolo Ramat (eds.) Historical Development of Auxiliaries (Trends in Linguistics. Studies and Monographs, 35). De Gruyter Mouton.
Pinkster, Harm (1990), Latin Syntax and Semantics. Chapter 11: The Latin tense system.
Postgate, J. P. (1905). "Repraesentatio Temporum in the Oratio Obliqua of Caesar". The Classical Review, Vol. 19, No. 9 (Dec., 1905), pp. 441–446.
Powell, J. G. F. (2005). "Cicero's adaptation of legal Latin in the de Legibus". In Reinhardt, T. et al. (eds). Aspects of the Language of Latin Prose. 
Salmon, E. T. (1931). "A Note on Subordinate Clauses in Oratio Obliqua". The Classical Review, Vol. 45, No. 5 (Nov., 1931), p. 173.
Terrell, Glanville (1904). "The Apodosis of the Unreal Condition in Oratio Obliqua in Latin". The American Journal of Philology, Vol. 25, No. 1 (1904), pp. 59–73.
Schlicher, J. J. (1931). "The Historical Tenses and Their Functions in Latin". Classical Philology Vol. 26, No. 1 (Jan., 1931), pp. 46–59.
Viti, Carlotta (2010). "The non-literal use of tenses in Latin, with particular reference to the praesens historicum". Revue de linguistique latine du Centre Alfred Ernout. (Posted at Zurich Open Repository and Archive, University of Zurich).
Wheeler, Arthur Leslie, (1903). "The Imperfect Indicative in Early Latin". The American Journal of Philology, Vol. 24, No. 2 (1903), pp. 163–191.
Wigtil, David N. (1992) "Translating Latin Tenses into English". The Classical World, Vol. 85, No. 6 (Jul. - Aug., 1992), pp. 675–686.
Woodcock, E.C. (1959), A New Latin Syntax.

References

Citations

Latin grammar